In mathematics, a reflection (also spelled reflexion) is a mapping from a Euclidean space to itself that is an isometry with a hyperplane as a set of fixed points; this set is called the axis (in dimension 2) or plane (in dimension 3) of reflection. The image of a figure by a reflection is its mirror image in the axis or plane of reflection. For example the mirror image of the small Latin letter p for a reflection with respect to a vertical axis would look like q. Its image by reflection in a horizontal axis would look like b. A reflection is an involution: when applied twice in succession, every point returns to its original location, and every geometrical object is restored to its original state.

The term reflection is sometimes used for a larger class of mappings from a Euclidean space to itself, namely the non-identity isometries that are involutions. Such isometries have a set of fixed points (the "mirror") that is an affine subspace, but is possibly smaller than a hyperplane. For instance a reflection through a point is an involutive isometry with just one fixed point; the image of the letter p under it
would look like a d. This operation is also known as a central inversion , and exhibits Euclidean space as a symmetric space. In a Euclidean vector space, the reflection in the point situated at the origin is the same as vector negation. Other examples include reflections in a line in three-dimensional space. Typically, however, unqualified use of the term "reflection" means reflection in a hyperplane.

Some mathematicians use "flip" as a synonym for "reflection".

Construction

In a plane (or, respectively, 3-dimensional) geometry, to find the reflection of a point drop a perpendicular from the point to the line (plane) used for reflection, and extend it the same distance on the other side. To find the reflection of a figure, reflect each point in the figure.

To reflect point  through the line  using compass and straightedge, proceed as follows (see figure):

Point  is then the reflection of point  through line .

Properties

The matrix for a reflection is orthogonal with determinant −1 and eigenvalues −1, 1, 1, ..., 1. The product of two such matrices is a special orthogonal matrix that represents a rotation. Every rotation is the result of reflecting in an even number of reflections in hyperplanes through the origin, and every improper rotation is the result of reflecting in an odd number. Thus reflections generate the orthogonal group, and this result is known as the Cartan–Dieudonné theorem.

Similarly the Euclidean group, which consists of all isometries of Euclidean space, is generated by reflections in affine hyperplanes.  In general, a group generated by reflections in affine hyperplanes is known as a reflection group. The finite groups generated in this way are examples of Coxeter groups.

Reflection across a line in the plane

Reflection across a line through the origin in two dimensions can be described by the following formula

Note the formula above can also be written as

Reflections in a line have the eigenvalues of 1, and −1.

Reflection through a hyperplane in n dimensions

Note that the second term in the above equation is just twice the vector projection of  onto . One can easily check that

Using the geometric product, the formula is

Since these reflections are isometries of Euclidean space fixing the origin they may be represented by orthogonal matrices. The orthogonal matrix corresponding to the above reflection is the matrix

Its entries are

where  is the Kronecker delta.

The formula for the reflection in the affine hyperplane  not through the origin is

See also
 Coordinate rotations and reflections
 Householder transformation
 Inversive geometry
 Plane of rotation
 Reflection mapping
 Reflection group

Notes

References

External links
 Reflection in Line at cut-the-knot
 Understanding 2D Reflection and Understanding 3D Reflection by Roger Germundsson, The Wolfram Demonstrations Project.

Euclidean symmetries
Functions and mappings
Linear operators
Transformation (function)